U.S. Route 431 (US 431) in Kentucky runs  from the Tennessee state line south of Adairville to US 60 at Owensboro. It crosses the state in mainly west-central portions of the state, passing through or near towns such as Russellville, Lewisburg, Central City and Livermore. The route goes through Logan, Muhlenberg, McLean County, and Daviess counties.

Route description 
US 431 enters the state going out of Robertson County, Tennessee, and into Logan County south of Adairville. It goes northward to Russellville, where it makes a left turn, and then a right turn to follow the Russellville Bypass to the north side of town. It becomes known as the Terry Wilcut Highway from Russellville to Lewisburg.

It enters Muhlenberg County to provide access to Lake Malone (via KY 973), and then goes on a northwesterly course to Central City, where it intersects the Wendell H. Ford Western Kentucky Parkway at a cloverleaf interchange, and the U.S. Route 62. Along the way to Central City from near Drakesboro, Kentucky Route 70 runs concurrently with the U.S. Route.

It then goes due north from Central City into eastern McLean County, crosses the Bridge at Livermore, where it crosses both the Green and Rough Rivers. It enters Daviess County and traverses the communities of Livia and Utica before terminating at the Wendell H. Ford Expressway (US 60) at Owensboro.

For a unique reason, the U.S. 431 crossing of the Green River and Rough Rivers in McLean County, Kentucky, is a famous river crossing. It is at that crossing in the city of Livermore that U.S. 431 crosses two rivers and also crosses into Ohio County before completing the river crossing back in McLean County. This is the only known crossing of this type in the United States: a road starts in one county, crosses two separate rivers, crosses a sliver of land within another county, and then terminates the bridge crossing in the original county it started in. This special feature is marked by a state historical marker on both approach ends of the bridge.

History 

In 1953, US 431 was extended into Tennessee and Kentucky from the Huntsville, Alabama area. From 1929, the US 431 corridor in Kentucky was originally signed as Kentucky Routes 75 and 81. KY 75 ran from Owensboro to KY 81 at South Carrollton, while KY 81 ran its current course, plus the rest of US 431's original route from South Carrollton into Central City and Russellville to the Tennessee state line.

US 431's original alignment in the city of Russellville became Kentucky Route 3519 in the mid 2000s, when the main US 431 alignment was rerouted onto the Russellville Bypass on the west side of town. As of mid-2010, Frederica Street in Owensboro no longer carries the US 431 designation into downtown Owensboro as KY 2831 is assigned onto that street.

In 2011, the US 431 alignment in Central City was rerouted onto the former KY 189 bypass on the west side of that city. This was done due to the low clearance of a bridge carrying the Paducah and Louisville Railroad tracks. US 431's original alignment in downtown is now designated as Kentucky Route 1031.

Major intersections

See also

References

External links

US 431 at Kentucky Roads 
Kentucky Transportation Cabinet

 Kentucky
31-4
0431
0431
0431
0431